Yeni Tahircal (also, Taardzhal, Tairdzhal, Tardzhal, and Yeny-Tairdzhal) is a village and municipality in the Qusar Rayon of Azerbaijan.

References 

Populated places in Qusar District